Duke of Pastrana is a hereditary title in the Peerage of Spain, accompanied by the dignity of Grandee and granted in 1572 by Philip II to Ruy Gómez de Silva, 1st Prince of Éboli, 1st Duke of Estremera and one of the king's advisors.

Dukes of Pastrana (1572)

Ruy Gómez de Silva, 1st Duke of Pastrana
Ruy Gómez de Silva y Mendoza, 2nd Duke of Pastrana
Ruy Gómez de Silva y de la Cerda, 3rd Duke of Pastrana
Rodrigo Díaz de Vivar y De Silva, 4th Duke of Pastrana
Gregorio María de Silva y Mendoza, 5th Duke of Pastrana
Juan de Dios de Silva y Haro, 6th Duke of Pastrana
María Teresa de Silva y Gutiérrez de los Ríos, 7th Duchess of Pastrana
Pedro de Alcántara Álvarez de Toledo y Silva, 8th Duke of Pastrana
Pedro de Alcántara Álvarez de Toledo y Salm-Salm, 9th Duke of Pastrana
Pedro de Alcántara Téllez-Girón y Beaufort Spontin, 10th Duke of Pastrana
Mariano Téllez-Girón y Beaufort Spontin, 11th Duke of Pastrana
Manuel Álvarez de Toledo y Lasparre, 12th Duke of Pastrana
Alfonso de Bustos y Bustos, 13th Duke of Pastrana
Rafael de Bustos y Ruiz de Arana, 14th Duke of Pastrana
Casilda de Bustos y Figueroa, 15th Duchess of Pastrana
José María de la Blanca Finat y de Bustos, 16th Duke of Pastrana

See also
List of dukes in the peerage of Spain
List of current Grandees of Spain

References 

Dukedoms of Spain
Grandees of Spain
Lists of dukes
Lists of Spanish nobility